Devadasu Malli Puttadu is a 1978 Indian Telugu-language drama film written and directed by Dasari Narayana Rao. It stars Akkineni Nageswara Rao and Vanisri, with music composed by S. Rajeswara Rao. It is produced by Srinivasulu and Pandurangappa. The film is a sequel to Devadasu (1953). The film is based on the concept of reincarnation, an idea chiseled in the mind of director Dasari Narayana Rao to give completeness to Devadasu's story.

Plot
The film begins Devadasu leaving his last breath in front of Parvathi's house and she rushes to see him, but the door is closed by her family and she collapses. Chandramukhi a courtesan who adores Devadasu, whom he promises to marry in the next life also dies at his Samadhi. Now the story begins; Devadasu takes rebirth as Sridhar Raja, Chandramukhi as Aruna and Parvathi is still waiting for Devadasu with a strong faith as she has a desire to serve him. The rest of the story is whether Devadasu comes back and how he reunites with Chandramukhi.

Cast

Crew
Art: Bhaskar Raju
Choreography: Pasumarthi, Chinni-Sampath, Raju, Seshu
Stills: Mohanji-Jaganji
Lyrics:C. Narayana Reddy, Veturi, Dasam Gopalakrishna
Playback: S. P. Balasubrahmanyam, V. Ramakrishna, P. Susheela, Ramana, Vasantha
Music: S. Rajeswara Rao
Editing:  K. Babu
Cinematography:  K. S. Mani
Assoiciate Director: Kodi Ramakrishna
Producer: Srinivasulu, Pandurangappa
Story - Screenplay - Dialogues - Director: Dasari Narayana Rao 
Banner: Devi Art Productions
Release Date: 1978

Music 

Music was composed by S. Rajeswara Rao.

References

External links
 

1970s Telugu-language films
1978 films
Indian drama films
Films directed by Dasari Narayana Rao
Films scored by S. Rajeswara Rao
Films about courtesans in India